Plouhinec is a commune in the Morbihan department of Brittany in north-western France.

Toponymy
From the Breton ploe (parish), ethin (ulex) and the suffix ek.

Population
Inhabitants of Plouhinec are called in French Plouhinecois.

Geography

Plouhinec is a seaside town located in the southern part of Morbihan. The commune is border by Atlantic ocean to the south and by Etel river to the east.

Map

See also
Communes of the Morbihan department

References

External links

Official website 

 Mayors of Morbihan Association 

Communes of Morbihan